The Gideon Wickersham Farmstead, also known as "Hame's Best," is an historic home which is located near Kennett Square, East Marlborough Township, Chester County, Pennsylvania. 

It was added to the National Register of Historic Places in 1988.

History and architectural features
The farmhouse was built in 1818, and is a square stone dwelling in a vernacular Georgian style. The home measures  and is constructed of schist and serpentine stone. 

To the east of the stone core is a nineteenth-century clapboard addition. The house has a two-story, frame addition with a flat roof. Also located on the property is a contributing barn.

This complex was added to the National Register of Historic Places in 1988.

References

Houses on the National Register of Historic Places in Pennsylvania
Georgian architecture in Pennsylvania
Houses completed in 1818
Houses in Chester County, Pennsylvania
National Register of Historic Places in Chester County, Pennsylvania